The Kerala Film Critics Association Award for Best Actor is an award presented annually at the Kerala Film Critics Association Awards, honouring the best performances by male actors in Malayalam films.

Superlatives

Winners

See also
 Kerala Film Critics Association Award for Best Actress

References

Actor
Film awards for lead actor